In the USSR, cyrillisation or cyrillization was the name of the campaign from the late 1930s to the 1950s which aimed to replace the writing system based on Latin script (draft of a common alphabet also knowing as Yanalif and Unified Northern Alphabet, which was introduced during the previous latinization program), to one based on Cyrillic.

History

Background
The cyrillization program cannot be separated from the changing views of the Soviet Union's leadership under Joseph Stalin in the mid-1930s. When the leader began to rule in absolute terms, he was worried about the appearance of parties that could become his enemies, especially from outside, such as Turkey (which borders the Azerbaijan SSR). The country has "brothers" in the form of Turkic nations in the Soviet Union (such as Turkmens and Azeris). Not to mention that a number of anti-Soviet emigrants who settled there, for example the Musavat Party from Azerbaijan, had been writing in Turkish (which had Latin letters since 1928) which the Soviets felt was not much different from the Azeri language in the Soviet Union (which had also been using the Latin alphabet since the early 1920s).

In the same period, the practice of korenizatsiya (indigenization) was officially discontinued; instead, the Soviet government began to emphasize the cultural and linguistic advantages of Russian as a "progressive language" and the "official language of the revolution", whereas all socialist countries needed to use only Russian because it was a "complete language". In the ideological discourse of the Communist Party it is stated that because various languages and cultures are currently developing well and peacefully, therefore it is time for these cultures to unite into one nation, namely the Soviet nation which uses one language, namely Russian (Japhetic theory).  With this it was hoped that Soviet people could become Homo Sovieticus who was loyal to the leadership of the Communist Party. On the contrary, indigenous culture is now seen as "bourgeois nationalism" which is inconsistent with the spirit of "proletarian internationalism". Also, the Latin alphabet previously used in many languages was now considered a "bourgeois script" that supported oppression, so that people who used it were "difficult to develop together".

In fact, the concerns of Soviet policymakers about the "separation" of peoples who use languages that use Latin script from Russian have been a debate since the 1920s. For example, in 1929, Semyon Dimanstein, a Soviet official in the nationalities policy, criticized the Latinization policy as a means of "separating the Turkic peoples from Russia".

Related to this is the use of two languages (namely Russian and other languages) which use different ways of writing. It is felt that the use of Latin scripts, which had been encouraged since the 1920s, prevented non-Russian peoples from learning the Russian language. As according to a statement submitted by one of the following sections of the CPSU:
[Students]... now have to get acquainted with two completely different writing systems at the same time in a relatively short period, often confusing the letters of one script with the letters of another (script).

With the transition to Cyrillic, it is hoped that non-Russian people can learn Russian more easily. Soviet Turcologists, such as Nikolai Baskakov, stated that learning Cyrillic script was a great tool to speed up the assimilation of non-Russians into Russian culture. Another argument also states that the transition to Cyrillic is not a "submission" of non-Russian culture into Russian culture, but rather "the most rational way" to develop the culture of a region, and a form of friendship with Russian people as well as a sign of internationalist unity for the entire Soviet population.

Another factor was the existence of a number of languages that have previously used Cyrillic scripts, such as Chuvash, Mari and Mordovian, which transition to Latin script is actually ineffective due to the large amount of literature written in Cyrillic before. Economic factors also have an effect, where printing using two scripts (Cyrillic and Latin) is considered inefficient.

Although many consider the transition from Latin to Cyrillic to be more due to political factors, in the campaign towards cyrillization, Soviet sources argued that linguistic factors were also important in supporting the process. For example, there is an argument that says that Cyrillic script are better at describing every sound than Latin script; some say that Cyrillic script are easier to learn; and another argument stated that the Latin script are not suitable for the languages to be cyrillicized.

Process
Cyrillization of many languages began in 1936–1937, and continued until the 1950s. In general, this process was preceded by campaigns and propaganda in various Soviet media. For example, it is claimed that in nations that have been writing their language using Latin script, there is an "enthusiasm" to change their writing system into Cyrillic. Various statements were issued to destroy the image of Latin script; for example, in the Azerbaijan SSR, it is said that Latin script are carriers of the spirit of Pan-Turkism, or its promoters are enemies of the people, while in Turkmen SSR and the Moldavian ASSR, those who reject the change to Cyrillic script are claimed to come from "enemies of the people, bourgeois-nationalists, and pro-Trotskyist-Bukharinist agents".

The situation was facilitated by the Great Purge, which helped those who wanted the cyrillization project to eliminate of those who had been considered pro-latinization. The tight control of the Stalinist regime in the late 1930s meant that discussion of the transition was almost non-existent. However, in every official decision regarding the transition from Latin to Cyrillic, the Soviet government often claimed there was a "direct request of the Soviet people" in the process – for example, during the transition in Tatar language, the Soviets claimed it was supported by "workers, intelligentsia and Tatar kolkhozniks", and in the Turkmen language, starting with a letter of support from group of teachers in the city of Baýramaly.

The first language whose writing was changed from Latin to Cyrillic was Kabardian in 1935–1936, which was followed by languages in the North in 1936. Later, the cyrillicization project was applied to almost all languages that had previously been romanized, for example, to Kazakh, Bashkir, and Tatar; by 1941, 60 of the Soviet Union's 67 written languages had been cyrillicized. The project continued into the 1950s, with a number of new languages being cyrillicized, such as Dungan, Kurdish and Uyghur. The process of cyrillicization also affected Soviet satellite states in the early 1940s, such as the Mongolian People's Republic and Tuva in their respective official languages (Mongolian and Tuvan). However, there are a number of languages that do not implement it, such as Estonian, Latvian, Lithuanian, Finnish, Georgian, Karelian, Armenian and Yiddish.

The Abkhaz and Ossetic language is a special case: these two languages are not converted into Cyrillic (unlike many Latinized alphabets), but were initially converted to Georgian scripts; only in the 1950s Abkhaz and Ossetic began to use Cyrillic. Some languages, which still do not have written forms during the peak of latinization campaigns such as Gagauz, are later also given Cyrillic-based alphabet.

In general, the process of converting to Cyrillic script in many languages tends to be hasty. For example, in Kyrgyz, Bashkir and Uzbek, just a short time after the new orthography of these languages was officially adopted, local parliaments passed decrees changing the writing system from Latin to Cyrillic. This led to many new Cyrillic-based alphabets being implemented with little regard for the specific features of each language. According to Turcologist Baskakov, the Latin scripts previously used actually correspond more to the phonetic aspects of the Turkic languages than Cyrillic. Development of the linguistic aspects of the newly cyrillicized languages was then complicated by events such as World War II and the effects of the Great Purge which eliminated the existing local elites. For example, the publication of the Tatar-Russian dictionary using the Cyrillic alphabet was only possible after de-Stalinization in the mid-1950s.

Features
Initially, in almost all projects of new Cyrillic alphabets, it was decided to use only the 33 letters of the Russian alphabet, with the addition of apostrophes, digraphs, trigraphs and tetragraphs for non-Russian languages. However, such an arrangement turned out to be very inconvenient and did not reflect the phonetic richness of many languages. As a result, additional letters were introduced in a number of alphabets (Tatar, Kazakh, Yakut, etc.). In the 1940s-1950s, in some languages (e.g. Altaic), digraphs were also replaced with additional letters.

While Soviet propaganda claimed that the switch to Cyrillic was better for the affected languages, in many cases the languages were not well adapted to the new cyrillicized alphabet. For example, in the Evenk language, there are phonemes that do not exist in Russian, but the letters are still written using the existing Russian scripts, without creating new letters. It is also noted that in a number of languages there are still orthographic changes (or proposed changes) that are made subsequently, such as in Tatar.

Effects
As previously mentioned, cyrillization cannot be separated from the Russification process. In general, this process is accompanied by efforts to absorb words from the Russian language on a large scale into non-Russian languages.

Examples are in many Turkic languages. By one estimate, initially only about 25-40 words from Russian were absorbed, but by the late 1960s, there were thousands of Russian words absorbed, many of which were words in common use. This is different from the process when korenizatsiya is carried out, which is characterized by efforts to purify local languages from foreign influences (in Turkic languages, by changing Arabic and Persian loanwords). During this period there were also attempts to replace words borrowed from Persian and Arabic for words borrowed from Russian; for example shura replaced by sovet, jumhuriyet replaced by respublika, and others. Not only that, the spelling and writing of these new words must also be in accordance with the Russian language.

Russification has also led to less and less use and teaching of local languages, with Russian being the main language spoken in many areas of life, while the local language or the mother tongue of its speakers being the language spoken only in the village or at home. In fact, there are also children who can only speak Russian without being able to use their mother tongue. The process of writing changes in a number of languages that occurred several times (as in the languages of Central Asia, from the Perso-Arabic script, to Latin script and finally to Cyrillic script) also made many peoples do not understand their own history and culture because they are unable to read their historical records in the past.

The cyrillicization process is also characterized by "artificial" efforts to separate and differentiate languages. As with the republics using Turkic languages, although they may have similarities, Soviet language planners generally used a different arrangement of letters and alternated different letters with each other. Pseudo-historical arguments are also included in the discussion of the history of the Turkic languages, such as the argument that these languages are considered very different - like what happened in the Indo-European language family (English, German and Russian), or Azeri language are related to North Caucasian languages existing in Dagestan. The result of this is that many Turkic peoples appear increasingly distinct or separated from their ethnic relatives, such as (Soviet) Azeris with Iranian Azeris and Turkish Turks.

After the collapse of the Soviet Union, several post-Soviet countries began to reintroduce Latin script as the main script for writing their national languages (e.g. Turkmen, Uzbek, and Azeri). One of the reasons for re-adopting the Latin script was to reverse the process of Russification that had arisen with the Soviet cyrillization attempts.

See also 
 Cyrillization of Chinese

References 

Soviet internal politics
Soviet culture
1930s in the Soviet Union
1940s in the Soviet Union
1950s in the Soviet Union